Pokémon Chronicles, partly known in Japan as , is a spin-off series of the original Pokémon anime, revolving around characters other than Ash Ketchum.

It first aired in Japan on October 15, 2002 on TV Tokyo  and concluded on September 28, 2004. An English adaptation dub was later produced and first aired in Britain on Toonami, where it ran between May 11, 2005 and October 5, 2005. The show aired in India on Cartoon Network in 2009. The series made its U.S. premiere on Cartoon Network on June 3, 2006, after it ended in most other countries.

Four DVDs have been released in the United Kingdom, with a U.S. release still non-existent. All of the episodes have been released as extras on the first six-season box sets of Pokémon in Australia (the newer 6 DVD box sets do not have the Pokémon Chronicles episodes, while the older 14 DVD sets do). A box set containing all 22 episodes has also been released in Australia.

Characters

 Ash Ketchum (サトシ, Satoshi): Ash is rarely seen. In the Winter Vacation episodes he is joined by Pikachu and some of Misty and Brock's Pokémon and meet a group of "Snow Snorlax."
 Brock (タケシ, Takeshi): Brock travelled around the Kanto region and the Johto region with Ash but between "Gotta Catch Ya Later" and "You Can Never Taillow", he visited his Pokémon Gym in Pewter City. There he found that his mother has taken over the gym, turning it into a Water Gym.
 Casey (ナナコ, Nanako): Casey was introduced in Johto, where she met Ash. They met a few times after that, although Casey only got 4 badges in the time it took Ash to get 8. When she is not training Pokémon, she is a big fan of the fictional Electabuzz baseball team. Her Pokémon are Meganium (her starter), Pidgey, Rattata, Beedrill (given by Ash), Elekid, and the dub says she has a Magmar and Rapidash. Casey owns two of the Pokémon that Ash failed to catch.
 Gary Oak (オ-キド・シゲル, Shigeru Ōkido): Gary Oak is Professor Oak's grandson. He was very stuck-up and traveled with his female cheerleaders around Kanto. He eventually matured after losing in the Indigo Plateau a round before Ash. He re-appeared in Johto, and after losing to Ash in the Silver Conference, decided to become a Pokémon Professor.
 Jimmy (ケンタ, Kenta): Jimmy is on his way to become a great Pokémon Master with his Typhlosion, so that he can help the kids in New Bark Town. He is based on the player character Gold (later renamed Ethan) from Pokémon Gold, Silver, and Crystal. He first appears in the first three episodes of the Pokémon Chronicles, called Raikou: The Legend of Thunder.
 Marina (マリナ, Marina) Marina is an old friend of Jimmy's, and she battles to entertain, always making sure she puts on a good show. She also performs in dance routines with her Pokémon. Marina is based on the female player  character Kris from Pokémon Crystal. Her favorite Pokémon are her Misdreavus (nicknamed "Little Miss") and Croconaw (nicknamed "Wani-Wani").  Marina also appears in episode 10 of Diamond & Pearl as the poster girl for the Poketch, on the back of a magazine Dawn was reading. She later appears in episode 41 of Diamond & Pearl in a video of her doing a double contest appeal.
 Vincent (ジュンイチ, Jun'ichi): Vincent battled Ash in the Silver Conference, although he was known there as Jackson. Vincent's favorite Pokémon is his Meganium. Vincent also was seen in the three parts of The Legend Of Thunder, as Marina's somewhat love interest, even going as far as calling himself Fabu-Vinny. He seems to get a little paranoid when it comes to Marina, getting jealous when Marina fell in love with Eusine (Who at that time, was dubbed as Eugene), because he wore a cape, just like Lance, the first known person that Marina actually likes (Fan-girl style), others being Jimmy and Eusine/Eugene.
 Misty (カスミ, Kasumi): Misty has travelled everywhere with Ash since he broke her bike, as well as with Brock and Tracy in the Orange Islands. But at the end of Johto saga of the Pokémon anime, her sisters went on a World Tour, and she had to become the official Gym Leader of Cerulean City. She is the major character in "Cerulean Blues".
 Professor Samuel Oak (オ-キド・ユキナリ博士, Yukinari Okido-hakase): Professor Samuel Oak is the world's foremost authority on Pokémon. When Trainers such as Ash Ketchum and Gary Oak begin their Pokémon Journey, Professor Oak gives them their starting Pokémon - Bulbasaur, Charmander, or Squirtle, (or Pikachu in Ash's case) When he is not looking after all the Pokémon that Trainers do not have with them at the time - (each trainer may carry up to six on his or her person) - he is studying them and upgrading the Pokédex.
 May (ハルカ, Haruka): May is rarely seen.
 Ritchie (ヒロシ, Hiroshi): Ritchie and his trusty Pikachu, Sparky, battled Ash at the Indigo Plateau, and they have been friends ever since, even though they only met once again (in the Whirl Islands.) Ritchie does decide to go and meet Ash in Hoenn, but he apparently decides against it, because he is later seen in the Sevii Islands.
 Tracey Sketchit (ケンジ, Kenji): Tracey Sketchit travelled with Ash and Misty in the Orange Islands, and is now a lab assistant for Professor Oak. He loves drawing, and has produced many accurate sketches of Pokémon. He is also good friends with Brock.
 Delia Ketchum (ハナコ, Hanako): Delia is Ash's mother. She really misses him while he is away, but she is happy at home with her Mr. Mime for company. She is also good friends with Professor Oak and Tracey.
 Gilbert (ハジメ, Hajime): Gilbert is a new Pokémon trainer (and the mayor's son in the English dub). He dislikes the Kanto starters and wants stronger Pokémon like Torchic rather than the ones that Professor Oak has to offer, but in the end, he chooses a Bulbasaur.
 Sakura (サクラ, Sakura): Sakura is one of the Kimono Sisters from Ecruteak City. She originally intended to join Ash, Misty, and Brock on their Pokémon Journey, but decided to stay at home and learn more first. She is now collecting badges in Kanto with her trusty Espeon and her new Beautifly.
 Atilla & Hun (ブソン & バショウ, Buson & Basho): Atilla & Hun are also members of Team Rocket, and are out to capture Raikou. Their names were derived from Atilla the Hun. (Hun is male in the Japanese version).
 Cassidy & Butch (ヤマト & コサブロウ, Yamato & Kosaburo): Cassidy &  Butch do not follow one Trainer around like Jessie & James do. They pick random worthwhile things and Pokémon to steal. Unfortunately for them, they usually choose people linked to Ash in some way. They are the main villains in Pokémon Chronicles. Their names are derived from the outlaw Butch Cassidy. In the anime, all of the characters, including Cassidy (though not as often) forget Butch's real name and calls him by a similar name, after which he gets into a fit.
 Dr. Namba (ナンバ博士, Nanba-hakase): Dr. Namba (unseen, but seen with a silhouette) appears after the first couple of minutes in various episodes when Cassidy and Butch are sent for trouble. He orders the two rocket members to do all sorts of stunts via satellite chip (well placed usually in various foods), but his plans always fails some way or the other. This is another Rocket member to constantly forget Butch's name.
 Jessie & James (ムサシ & コジロウ, Musashi & Kojiro): Jessie & James are starting up the Hoenn branch of Team Rocket (along with their talking Meowth partner). When they aren't trying to capture Pikachu, they are spreading the name of Team Rocket for their boss. Their English names were derived from the outlaw Jesse James.
 Professor Sebastian (シライ博士, Dr. Shiranui): Professor Sebastian appears in several episodes in the anime. He orders Atilla & Hun to capture Raikou.

Opening and ending
When shown on Shūkan Pokémon Hōsōkyoku, the episodes did not have a musical opening. Instead, they open with Brock and Misty talking (except for the Team Rocket episodes, where said characters would talk instead). Normally, it would result in Misty hitting Brock with a mallet, fan, or water gun for acting out of line. The endings would normally deal with that episode's character. When released on DVD these sequences were omitted entirely.
The Japanese episodes were seen as special episodes, hence the unconventional opening. However, it was dubbed as a completely new series, so a musical opening was required. While the openings from the main series interlink scenes from the related Japanese opening with scenes from the episodes, there was no Japanese opening for Pokémon Chronicles, A new opening was created. Some of the scenes in the opening are taken from the Japanese Legend of Thunder opening, the rest are taken from episodes. There are 42 scenes in 36 seconds.

The ending is a repeat of the opening on the left of the screen, with the credits rolling past on the right. There are a few variations, however. The DVD version and first two parts of The Legend of Thunder shows footage from the battle at the start of Part Two. The ending for Pikachu's Winter Vacation on the DVD rolls over a full screen picture taken from the episode.

The original theme tune is a modified version of the "G/S Pokerap". However, there is an instrumental in the middle, where the narrator basically says what Chronicles is about:

Old friends!
New adventures!
Never before seen stories from the world of Pokémon!

When the series aired in America, starting with the second episode, the intro sequence was changed to a newer version, consisting of a montage of various scenes from "The Legend of Thunder" with more intense music. In the original of "The Legend of Thunder", it also features a cameo by the Johto rival, and later in another episode.

Episode list

DVD releases
The episodes have been released on DVD in a number of markets, excluding Region 1.  English language releases are limited to Regions 2 and 4.

The complete series was released in the UK by Contender Entertainment Group in four volumes, released between 2005 and 2006. The first volume contained a feature-length version of The Legend of Thunder alongside the first Pikachu's Winter Vacation part, and "A Family That Battles Together Stays Together!". Volumes 2 and 3 were each combined into a single release and have five episodes each. Volume 4 contains seven episodes. A boxset containing the first three volumes was also released, but with slightly different packaging than the standalone creations. The DVDs do not contain any subtitles, or special features besides episode and scene selection.

Cast

Japanese cast

 Ikue Ōtani as Pikachu
 Rika Matsumoto as Satoshi
 KAORI as Haruka
 Inuko Inuyama as Nyarth
 Mayumi Iizuka as Kasumi
 Megumi Hayashibara as Musashi
 Shinichiro Miki as Kojiro
 Satomi Koorogi as Togepi
 Tomokazu Seki as Kenji
 Minami Takayama as Hiroshi
 Unshou Ishizuka as Okido-Hakase
 Masami Toyoshima as Hanako
 Yuji Ueda as Takeshi
 Yuko Kobayashi as Shigeru
 Takehito Koyasu as Kosaburo
 Unshou Ishiduka as Narrator
 Chinami Nishimura as Junsa

English cast

 Jimmy - Sean Schemmel
 Marina - Caren Manuel
 Hun, Delia Ketchum, Ash Ketchum (in cameos), May (in cameos) - Veronica Taylor
 Attila - Marc Thompson
 Vincent - Kevin Kolack
 Eugene (known as Euisine in the main series) - Dan Green
 Misty, Jessie, Violet - Rachael Lillis
 Daisy - Lisa Ortiz
 Nurse Joy - Bella Hudson
 Officer  Jenny - Lee Quick
 Professor Oak - Stan Hart
 Ritchie, Benny DeMario, Bulbasaur, Phanpy and Teddiursa - Tara Jayne
 Tracey Sketchit, Giovanni - Ed Paul
 Sakura, Casey - Kerry Williams
 Narrator - Mike Pollock
 James, Brock, Professor Sebastian, Butch, Weezing - Eric Stuart
 Meowth - Maddie Blaustein
 Dr. Nanba, Gary Oak - Jimmy Zoppi
 Gilbert - Jason Griffith
 Celebi - Kazuko Sugiyama
 Cassidy, Teddiursa - Andi Whaley
 DJ Mary - Amy Birnbaum
 Pikachu - Ikue Ōtani
 Arbok - Koichi Sakaguchi
 Togepi - Satomi Korogi
 Corey DeMario - Matt Hoverman
 Narrator - Rodger Parsons (credited as Ken Gates)

See also
List of Pokémon episodes (seasons 14–current)

References

External links
Dogasu's Backpack Dogasu does original to English dub comparisons. Out of the Pokémon Chronicles episodes, 1-21 are finished.
Serebii.net Long descriptions and pictures for each episode.

2005 Japanese television series endings
Anime spin-offs
Anime television series based on video games
Japanese anthology television series
OLM, Inc.
Chronicles
Toonami